Corina-Simona Olar-Corniciuc (born 27 August 1984) is a Romanian footballer. She currently plays for Olimpia Cluj and the Romanian national team as a defender.

References

1984 births
Living people
Romanian women's footballers
Romania women's international footballers
Sportspeople from Hunedoara
Women's association football defenders
Expatriate women's footballers in Cyprus
Apollon Ladies F.C. players
FCU Olimpia Cluj players
Romanian expatriate sportspeople in Cyprus